Metel was a Soviet ship.

Metel can also mean:

 The Blizzard (or The Snow Storm) (Metél' ), a story by Aleksandr Pushkin
 The Blizzard (1964 film). an adaptation of the story directed by Vladimir Basov
 Datura metel, a plant
 Metel Anti-Ship Complex (SS-N-14 'Silex'), a Soviet rocket-thrown torpedo similar to ASROC